The Florida Gulf Coast Eagles men's soccer team represents Florida Gulf Coast University in Fort Myers, Florida in all NCAA Division I men's soccer competitions. The Eagles compete in the Atlantic Sun Conference. The soccer team is one of several varsity sports teams that represent the Florida Gulf Coast Eagles.

The team made the NCAA tournament in the first year of eligibility in 2011, and returned in 2012, 2014, and 2016.

Seasons 

Source:

NCAA tournament results

Coaching staff 

Bob Butehorn has served as head coach for Florida Gulf Coast Eagles men's soccer since the program's inception in 2007. Butehorn has been successful at FGCU, posting a perfect 9–0–0 conference record in 2010, and qualifying for three NCAA Division I tournaments (2011, 2012, and 2014). 
Since becoming NCAA eligible, the Eagles have won the regular season or conference tournament each year they have been eligible.

Notable players
 Rodrigo Saravia — 2015 Atlantic Sun Conference Player of the Year; first FGCU soccer player invited to the Major League Soccer Player Combine; plays for Swope Park Rangers and the Guatemala national football team.

Honors 

Atlantic Sun Conference
Winners (Tournament) (4): 2011, 2012, 2014, 2016
Winners (Regular Season) (6): 2010, 2011, 2012, 2013, 2014, 2015

References

External links 
 

 
Florida Gulf Coast Eagles
2007 establishments in Florida
Association football clubs established in 2007